Yale Law School (YLS) is the law school of Yale University, a private research university in New Haven, Connecticut. It was established in 1824 and has been ranked as the best law school in the United States by U.S. News & World Report every year between 1990 and 2022, when Yale made a decision to voluntarily pull out of the rankings, citing issues with the rankings' methodology. One of the most selective academic institutions in the world, the 2020–21 acceptance rate was 4%, the lowest of any law school in the United States. Its yield rate of 87% is also consistently the highest of any law school in the United States.

Yale Law alumni include many prominent figures in law and politics, including United States presidents Gerald Ford and Bill Clinton and former U.S. secretary of state and presidential nominee, Hillary Clinton. Alumni also include current United States Supreme Court associate justices Clarence Thomas, Samuel Alito, Sonia Sotomayor and Brett Kavanaugh, as well as a number of former justices, including Abe Fortas, Potter Stewart and Byron White; several heads of state, including Karl Carstens, the fifth president of Germany, Jose P. Laurel, the third president of the Republic of the Philippines; and Peter Mutharika, the immediate former president of Malawi; five current U.S. senators; the former governor of California and immediate former governor of Rhode Island and current United States Secretary of Commerce; and the current deans of two of the top fourteen-ranked law schools in the United States: Virginia and Cornell.

Each class in Yale Law's three-year J.D. program enrolls approximately 200 students. Yale's flagship law review is the Yale Law Journal, one of the most highly cited legal publications in the United States. According to Yale Law School's ABA-required disclosures, 83% of the Class of 2019 obtained full-time, long-term, JD-required or JD-advantage employment nine months after graduation, excluding solo practitioners.

History 

The school began in the New Haven law office of Seth P. Staples in the 1800s, who began training lawyers.  By 1810 he was operating a law school.  He took on a former student, Samuel J. Hitchcock as a law partner, and Hitchcock became the proprietor of the New Haven Law School, joined by David Daggett in 1824. The Yale Law School shield (shown at the upper right of this page) shows staples and a rampant dog, representing Seth Staples and David Daggett. The school's affiliation with Yale began in the mid-1820s and in 1843, the school's students began receiving Yale degrees.

Daggett went on to serve as mayor of New Haven, U.S. Senator, and judge on Connecticut's highest court. An opponent of education for African Americans and a supporter of colonization, he helped lead opposition to the establishment of a college for African Americans in New Haven and presided over the trial of a woman who ran a boarding school for African American girls.

20th century 
A special relationship or connection developed between YLS and the United States Court of Appeals for the Second Circuit. Professors Clark and Frank, among others, became judges on that court. Some of the faculty members who became Second Circuit judges continued to teach courses at YLS and chose their clerks from student graduates. These judges influenced thinking in general at YLS and particularly reinforced student interest in public service, a characteristic tradition at YLS since the New Deal.

21st century 
The law school's 15th dean, Harold Koh (2004–2009), made human rights a focus of the law school's work, building on a tradition that had developed over the previous two decades. On March 23, 2009, the White House announced the appointment of Koh to the United States Department of State as the Legal Adviser of the Department of State. Robert C. Post was selected to replace him as dean of the law school.

In 2022, two federal appeals judges, James C. Ho and Elizabeth L. Branch, stopped hiring Yale Law graduates as clerks because of concerns the school suppresses conservative views. The school responded by initiating actions to "reaffirm its commitment to free speech", which included an orientation about "free expression" and "respectful engagement", the appointment of a new dean to help law students "resolve disagreements", and a prohibition on secret recordings and disruption of campus events.

Academics

Culture 
The institution is known for its scholarly orientation; a relatively large number of its graduates (9%) choose careers in academia within five years of graduation, while a relatively low number (46%) choose to work in law firms five years after graduation. Another feature of Yale Law's culture since the 1930s, among both faculty and student graduates, has been an emphasis on the importance of spending at least a few years in government service. A similar emphasis has long been placed on service as a judicial law clerk upon graduation. Its 7.6:1 student-to-faculty ratio is the third lowest among U.S. law schools.

Yale Law does not have a traditional grading system, a consequence of student unrest in the late 1960s. Instead, it grades first-semester first-year students on a simple Credit/No Credit system. For their remaining two-and-a-half years, students are graded on an Honors/Pass/Low Pass/Fail system. Similarly, the school does not rank its students. It is also notable for having only a single semester of required classes (plus two additional writing requirements), instead of the full year most U.S. schools require. Unusually, and as a result of unique Connecticut State court rules, Yale Law allows first-year students to represent clients through one of its numerous clinics; other law schools typically offer this opportunity only to second- and third-year students.

Students publish nine law journals that, unlike those at most other schools, mostly accept student editors without a competition. The only exception is YLS's flagship journal, the Yale Law Journal, which holds a two-part admissions competition each spring, consisting of a four or five-hour "bluebooking exam," followed by a traditional writing competition. Although the Journal identifies a target maximum number of members to accept each year, it is not a firm number. Other leading student-edited publications include the Yale Journal on Regulation, the Yale Law and Policy Review, and the Yale Journal of International Law.

In November 2013, it was announced that a $25 million donation would bring student dormitory living back onto campus, with renovations to begin in 2018.

Rankings 
Yale Law has been ranked the number one law school in the United States by U.S. News & World Report between 1990 and 2022. Among U.S. law schools, Yale has the lowest acceptance rate and the highest yield rate—whereas less than 5% of applicants are admitted, about 80% of those who are accepted ultimately enroll, either in the Fall following their acceptance or after a deferral. It is currently ranked as the second best law school in U.S (behind Harvard) and fourth in the world by the 2016 QS Rankings. The school also saw a greater percentage of its students go on to become Supreme Court clerks between the 2000 and 2010 terms than any other law school, more than double the percentage of the second-highest law school (Harvard Law School).  Additionally, a 2010 survey of "scholarly impact," measured by per capita citations to faculty scholarship, found Yale's faculty to be the most cited law school faculty in the United States.

In November 2022, Yale made a voluntary decision to pull out of the U.S. News & World Report Best Law Schools rankings. Describing their methodology as "profoundly flawed," Yale claimed that the rankings discourage low-income applicants and "fail to advance the legal profession" by devaluing programs that encourage public interest profession rather than high-paying corporate jobs. Yale's decision was followed by Harvard Law School, which also withdrew from the rankings.

Admissions 
Yale Law School enrolls about 200 new students a year, creating one of the smallest classes among top U.S. law schools. Its small class size and prestige combine to make its admissions process the most competitive in the United States. Half of the class that entered in 2015 had a GPA above 3.93 and/or an LSAT score above 173 (on a possible scale of 120 to 180) or 99th percentile.

After an initial round of screening by the admissions department, approximately 25% of applications are independently evaluated by three different faculty members. Each application is scored from 2–4 at the discretion of the reader. All applicants with a perfect 12 (i.e., a 4 from all three faculty members) are admitted, upon which they are immediately notified by the school. There are also 50–80 outstanding students admitted each year without going through this review process.

The LL.M. Program and the Visiting Researchers Program at Yale Law are amongst the smallest and most selective graduate law programs in the United States. Yale Law admits around 25 LL.M. students and around 10 visiting researchers every year. These programs are usually limited to those students who intend to pursue a career in legal academia.

Yale Law admitted only men until 1918.

Clinical programs 
The Yale Law School houses over two dozen clinics that allow students to represent clients in real-world legal problems. Participation in clinics is common among Yale Law students, with over 80% of degree candidates participating in clinical activities prior to graduation.

Yale Law's clinics cover a wide range of issue areas and legal fields. Students represent clients before courts at all levels of the federal judiciary, state courts in Connecticut and other states, international tribunals and adjudicative bodies, administrative processes, and private arbitration. The Yale Law School has greatly expanded its clinical programs in recent years, adding eight new clinics during the 2016-2017 academic year.

Summer school with Paris 2 Panthéon-Assas University 

Yale Law School signed in June 2011 an Agreement for Collaborative Activities to create an environment for long-term joint research, exchange and programming activities, with Paris 2 Panthéon-Assas University, the direct inheritor of the Faculty of Law of Paris and acting law school of the Sorbonne University. They organize, together with the ESSEC Business School, a summer school in law and economics, the Yale-Paris II-Essec Summer School.

Centers and workshops 

 The Paul Tsai China Center
 Yale Law School Center for the Study of Corporate Law
 Center for Global Legal Challenges
 Cultural Cognition Project
 Debating Law and Religion Series
 Yale Center for Environmental Law and Policy
 Yale Law School Center for Global Legal Challenges
 Global Health Justice Partnership
 Gruber Program for Global Justice and Women's Rights
 Human Rights Workshop: Current Issues & Events
 Information Society Project
 The Justice Collaboratory
 Abdallah S. Kamel Center for the Study of Islamic Law and Civilization
 Knight Law & Media Program
 Yale Law School Latin American Legal Studies
 Yale Center for Law and Philosophy
 Law, Economics & Organization Workshop
Law, Ethics, & Animals Program
 Legal History Forum
 Legal Theory Workshop
 The Arthur Liman Public Interest Program
 Middle East Legal Studies Seminar
 John M. Olin Center for Law, Economics and Public Policy
 Yale Law School Center for the Study of Private Law
 Quinnipiac-Yale Dispute Resolution Workshop
 Program for the Study of Reproductive Justice
 Robina Foundation Human Rights Fellowship Initiative
 Solomon Center for Health Law & Policy
 The Oscar M. Ruebhausen Fund
 Orville H. Schell, Jr. Center for International Human Rights
 Workshop on Chinese Legal Reform
 Tech Accountability & Competition Project

Cost and employment 
The total cost of attendance (indicating the cost of tuition, fees, and living expenses) at Yale Law School for the 2021–2022 academic year is $93,923. In 2015, the Law School Transparency estimated debt-financed cost of attendance (including cost of living) for three years is $289,879. According to Law School Data, the average student who borrowed money to attend Yale Law School in the graduating class of 2022 graduated with $143,437 in debt.

The annual total cost of attendance (indicating the cost of tuition, fees, mandatory university health insurance, and living expenses) at Yale Law School for the 2021–2022 academic year is $93,821.

According to Yale Law School's official 2013 ABA-required disclosures, 78.8% of the Class of 2013 accepted full-time, long-term, JD-required employment nine months after graduation, excluding solo-practitioners. Yale Law School's Law School Transparency under-employment score is 8.4%, indicating the percentage of the Class of 2013 unemployed, pursuing an additional degree, or working in a non-professional, short-term, or part-time job nine months after graduation.

The median salary for a class of 2021 graduate 10 months after graduation was $94,000. and the mean salary for a class of 2021 graduate 10 months after graduation was $136,943.

The law school was ranked # 17 of all law schools nationwide by the National Law Journal in terms of sending the highest percentage of 2015 graduates to the largest 100 law firms in the US (23.58%).

Notable people

Deans of Yale Law School 

 1873–1903 Francis Wayland III
 1903–1916 Henry Wade Rogers
 1916–1927 Thomas Walter Swan
 1927–1929 Robert Maynard Hutchins
 1929–1939 Charles Edward Clark
 1940–1946 Ashbel Green Gulliver
 1946–1954 Wesley Alba Sturges
 1954–1955 Harry Shulman
 1955–1965 Eugene Victor Rostow
 1965–1970 Louis Heilprin Pollak
 1970–1975 Abraham Samuel Goldstein
 1975–1985 Harry Hillel Wellington
 1985–1994 Guido Calabresi
 1994–2004 Anthony Kronman
 2004–2009 Harold Hongju Koh
 2009–2017 Robert C. Post
 2017–present Heather K. Gerken

Current prominent faculty 

 Bruce Ackerman, constitutional and political science scholar, op-ed writer, and Sterling Professor.
 Akhil Amar, leading constitutional law scholar, writer and consultant to the television show The West Wing, and Sterling Professor.
 Ian Ayres, law and economics scholar, author of Why Not? and frequent commentator on NPR's Marketplace program.
 Jack Balkin, First Amendment scholar, legal blogger, founder and director of the Yale Information Society Project.
 Aharon Barak, former president of the Israeli Supreme Court from 1995 to 2006.
 Stephen Bright, human rights attorney and former director of the Southern Center for Human Rights.
 Lea Brilmayer, expert in international law, conflict of laws, and personal jurisdiction.
 Guido Calabresi, judge on the United States Court of Appeals for the Second Circuit, Sterling Professor, and former dean of the Yale Law School.
 Lincoln Caplan, author, journalist, Truman Capote Visiting Lecturer in Law and Senior Research Scholar in Law.
 Stephen L. Carter, William Nelson Cromwell Professor of Law and author of a number of books, including the novel The Emperor of Ocean Park.
 Amy Chua, international affairs scholar and author of Battle Hymn of the Tiger Mother and World on Fire: How Exporting Free Market Democracy Breeds Ethnic Hatred and Global Instability.
 Mirjan Damaška, Sterling Professor, comparative criminal law scholar, and advisor to various international tribunals, including the International Criminal Tribunal for the former Yugoslavia and the International Court of Justice.
 Drew S. Days, III, former United States Solicitor General.
 Robert Ellickson, property and land use law scholar.
 William Eskridge, constitutional law scholar, legislation and statutory interpretation scholar, and one of the most cited law professors in the U.S.
 Daniel C. Esty, environmental law and policy expert, former Commissioner of the Connecticut Department of Energy and Environmental Protection, and director of the Yale Center for Environmental Law and Policy.
 Owen M. Fiss, liberalism and free speech scholar and Sterling Professor.
 James Forman Jr., leading criminal law scholar and Pulitzer Prize recipient.
 Heather K. Gerken, election law, federalism, and constitutional law scholar.
 Linda Greenhouse, Pulitzer prize winning author and New York Times correspondent covering the Supreme Court of the United States for more than 30 years.
 Henry B. Hansmann, law and economics scholar, and leading theorist on organizational ownership and design.
 Christine Jolls, law and behavioral economics scholar, employment law scholar.
 Dan M. Kahan, criminal law and evidence scholar, director of the Supreme Court Advocacy Clinic.
 Harold Hongju Koh, international law expert, former dean of the law school, former Legal Adviser of the Department of State, and Sterling Professor.
 Anthony Kronman, Sterling Professor and leading scholar on contracts, bankruptcy, jurisprudence, social theory, and professional responsibility.
 John Langbein, legal historian and trusts and estates scholar.
 Jonathan R. Macey, corporate/banking law scholar.
 Daniel Markovits, law and philosophy scholar.
 Jerry L. Mashaw, administrative law scholar and Sterling Professor.
 Robert C. Post, constitutional law scholar with a particular focus on the First Amendment and equal protection.
 George L. Priest, antitrust scholar.
 Jed Rubenfeld, constitutional theorist and criminal law scholar.
 Roberta Romano, corporate law scholar, and first female Sterling Professor at the Yale Law School.
 Reva Siegel, constitutional law scholar with a particular focus on social movements and equality.
 Kate Stith, constitutional law and criminal procedure expert.
 Ralph K. Winter, Jr., senior circuit judge and former chief judge, United States Court of Appeals for the Second Circuit.
 Michael Wishnie, clinical professor, expert on immigration.
 John Fabian Witt, legal historian.
 Stephen Wizner, William O. Douglas Clinical Professor of Law.

Notable alumni

Notes

Further reading

External links 

 Official website

 
1824 establishments in Connecticut
Educational institutions established in 1824
Education in New Haven, Connecticut
Law schools in Connecticut
Universities and colleges in New Haven County, Connecticut
Law School